Moriah was a Hebrew language daily newspaper, published in Ottoman Palestine between 1910 and 1915.

History 
The newspaper was founded in Jerusalem by the printer Rabbi Yehuda Aharon Weiss, after the downfall of "Habazeleth" that was, prior to that, the leading newspaper of the Haredi Jewish community in Jerusalem. The permit to publish "Moriah", which was also the name of the printing house that printed the newspaper (owned by Weiss and his partner, Rabbi Moshe Samuel Schinbaum), was granted by the Ottoman authorities, after assuring they would abide with the Ottoman law.

The newspaper's chief editor, in all its years of publication, was Yitzhak Yaakov Yellin, who also wrote a significant portion of its articles. Together with Weiss, Yellin made it a goal of the newspaper to reform the "Old Yishuv" and its public conduct. Right from the first issue, the founders express their intent of addressing the Haredi Jews in a manner representing free speech and objectivity.

The first issues of Moriah were published weekly, but later on it was published daily, with an extended weekly issue intended for readers out of the country.

The newspaper was shut down by the Ottoman authorities on 11 January 1915 (כ"ה בטבת תרע"ה), in the peak of the First World War, after Yellin breached the order to refrain from dealing with political matters.

External links 

 Moriah archive on the National Library of Israel web site
 Moriah full text search version on the Historical Jewish Press web site
 העולם בצהוב: לידת עיתונות ההמון הארץ ישראלית : (מ"הצבי" ל"האור", 1914-1884), by Uzzi Elyada, Tel Aviv University press, 2015

References 

Hebrew-language newspapers
Yishuv newspapers
1910s in Jerusalem